"No Matter How High" is a song written by Even Stevens and Joey Scarbury, and recorded by American country music group The Oak Ridge Boys.  It was released in December 1989 as the second single from the album American Dreams.  The song was The Oak Ridge Boys' seventeenth and final number one on the country chart.  The single went to number one for one week and spent a total of twenty-one weeks on the country chart.

Music video
The music video, directed by Larry Boothby, features each of the Oaks in their hometowns, each visiting with their respective mothers. The original intent was to have the group sing the song to their mothers in the video, however, Duane Allen's mother was ill at the time, so Boothby decided to incorporate their hometowns, thus avoiding any lengthy or strenuous travel.

Chart performance

Year-end charts

Remake
In 2011, the group rerecorded the song with a new arrangement and lead singer Duane Allen on lead vocals for their It's Only Natural project at Cracker Barrel Old Country Store. The album included songs originally sung by Steve Sanders, who succeeded William Lee Golden on baritone vocals. The lineup on the new album included Golden.

References

1989 singles
The Oak Ridge Boys songs
Song recordings produced by Jimmy Bowen
MCA Records singles
Songs written by Even Stevens (songwriter)
1989 songs